Sierraville (Sierra, Spanish for "mountain range" and Ville, French for "town") is a census-designated place in Sierra County, California, United States. It is at the southern end of the huge Sierra Valley which is used primarily as pasture and is also at the junction of California State Route 49 and California State Route 89 southwest of Loyalton. Sierraville has a post office with ZIP code 96126. The post office opened under the name Sierra Valley in 1862 and became known as the Sierraville post office in 1899. The population was 200 as of the 2010 census.

It is the site of the only traffic signal (a flashing red light) in Sierra County. In the winter of 2007, it was removed after an automobile accident and was replaced in the fall of 2008.

Geography
According to the United States Census Bureau, the CDP covers an area of 5.0 square miles (13.0 km), 99.98% of it land and 0.02% of it water.

Climate
This region experiences warm (but not hot) and dry summers, with no average monthly temperatures above 71.6 °F. According to the Köppen Climate Classification system, Sierraville has a warm-summer Mediterranean climate, abbreviated "Csb" on climate maps.

Demographics
The 2010 United States Census reported that Sierraville had a population of 200. The racial makeup of Sierraville was 187 (93.5%) White, 2 (1.0%) African American, 0 (0.0%) Native American, 0 (0.0%) Asian, 0 (0.0%) Pacific Islander, 10 (5.0%) from other races, and 1 (0.5%) from two or more races. Hispanic or Latino of any race were 16 persons (8.0%).

The Census reported that 200 people (100% of the population) lived in households, 0 (0%) lived in non-institutionalized group quarters, and 0 (0%) were institutionalized.

There were 95 households, out of which 13 (13.7%) had children under the age of 18 living in them, 50 (52.6%) were opposite-sex married couples living together, 5 (5.3%) had a female householder with no husband present, 4 (4.2%) had a male householder with no wife present. There were 9 (9.5%) unmarried opposite-sex partnerships, and 0 (0%) same-sex married couples or partnerships. 26 households (27.4%) were made up of individuals, and 7 (7.4%) had someone living alone who was 65 years of age or older. The average household size was 2.11. There were 59 families (62.1% of all households); the average family size was 2.51.

The population was spread out, with 21 people (10.5%) under the age of 18, 12 people (6.0%) aged 18 to 24, 33 people (16.5%) aged 25 to 44, 89 people (44.5%) aged 45 to 64, and 45 people (22.5%) who were 65 years of age or older. The median age was 52.6 years. For every 100 females, there were 117.4 males. For every 100 females age 18 and over, there were 113.1 males.

The homeowner vacancy rate was 1.4%; the rental vacancy rate was 12.9%. 144 people (72.0% of the population) lived in owner-occupied housing units and 56 people (28.0%) lived in rental housing units.

Politics

References

Census-designated places in Sierra County, California
Census-designated places in California
1862 establishments in California